Milestone S.r.l. is an Italian video game developer based in Milan. Founded in 1994 by Antonio Farina, the studio specialises in racing games, especially motorcycle racing games. The company began under the name Graffiti, developing the car racing game Screamer. After the studio rebranded as Milestone in 1996, it used Screamers success for multi-game publishing deals with Virgin Interactive and Electronic Arts. The poor performance of Racing Evoluzione, published by Atari with little marketing, lead to key figures leaving Milestone. As part of Leader Group from 2002 on, the studio hired many younger developers and developed multiple games for multiple platforms, including several based on the Superbike World Championship. This shaped Milestone's identity as a developer of motorcycle racing games. After detaching from Leader Group in 2011, the studio obtained the license for MotoGP games in 2013. In 2019, Milestone was acquired by Koch Media.

History 
Antonio Farina founded Milestone as Graffiti in 1994. The nascent studio's first notable game was Screamer, a racing game for personal computers. In 1996, the studio rebranded as Milestone and used Screamers success to reach publishing agreements with Virgin Interactive and Electronic Arts (EA). Virgin Interactive published Screamer 2 and Screamer Rally, while EA obtained a licence for games based on the Superbike World Championship (SBK). Milestone and EA worked on three such games released through 2000. These games grew Milestone's visibility and led to a deal with Atari. The publisher was in a troubled financial situation at the time and approached Milestone with a game idea for what became Racing Evoluzione. The deal appeared like a good idea to Milestone but Atari provided little marketing and released it in 2003 in direct competition with Project Gotham Racing. In late 2002, Milestone joined Leader Group. Racing Evoluzione attracted mixed reviews and underperformed commercially, leading to the departures of key figures at the company. Consequently, the studio hired many younger developers, who sought to take the studio in a new direction. As part of Leader Group, Milestone initially worked exclusively with the internal publisher Lago but later found that working with external publishers would be in its best interest. Still, Milestone's position as a subsidiary allowed it to grow and develop multiple games for multiple platforms simultaneously.

With its younger staff, Milestone developed games that aimed to compete with the Gran Turismo series, albeit with limited scopes. This resulted in the production of Alfa Romeo Racing Italiano and Corvette Evolution GT. The studio then returned to games based on motorcycle racing, a popular sport in Italy, with Super-Bikes Riding Challenge. The game, released in 2006, greatly shaped the studio's identity, and it continued developing motorcycle racing games, including further games with an SBK license. It also supported Capcom's MotoGP games. Milestone grew to 55 employees by October 2007 and to 80 by January 2010, making it the largest video game developer in Italy. In 2011, Milestone restructured as an independent company, aiming for further growth while remaining self-reliant. Milestone obtained the licence for MotoGP-based games in 2013 and released the first such game, MotoGP 13, later that year. The success of the studio's MotoGP games led to licensing deals with FIM Motocross, WRC, and Monster Energy Supercross. On 14 August 2019, Koch Media acquired Milestone, at the time with 200 employees, and all of its intellectual property for  paid in cash. Chief executive officer Luisa Bixio remained with the studio after acquisition.

Games developed

As Graffiti

As Milestone

Cancelled titles

References

External links 
 

2002 mergers and acquisitions
2019 mergers and acquisitions
Companies based in Milan
Italian companies established in 1994
Plaion
Video game companies established in 1994
Video game companies of Italy
Video game development companies